Glen Easton is an unincorporated community in southern Marshall County, West Virginia, United States.  It lies along local roads southeast of the city of Moundsville, the county seat of Marshall County.  Its elevation is 945 feet (288 m).  It has a post office with the ZIP code 26039.

The community was named after the local Easton family.

In 1879, the village was reported to have two dry goods stores, a shoe shop, a gristmill, and a post office.

Notable person
Beryl Richmond, baseball player.

References

Populated places in Marshall County, West Virginia
Unincorporated communities in West Virginia